X46Cr13 is the European Norm name for a common martensitic stainless steel with the numeric name 1.4034. It is equivalent to American Iron and Steel Institute standard 420C. It has the highest carbon content of the SAE 420 series.

Properties 
X46Cr13 has good workability when hot, and potential to reach high hardness of up to 56 HRC. It contains a moderately high carbon ratio of approximately 0.46% which gives it a good compromise between high hardness and corrosion resistance for many applications. It is also relatively inexpensive to produce.

X46Cr13 is a basic steel without molybdenum, nitrogen or vanadium. It can be outperformed (typically at a higher cost) by more advanced steels like N680 with similar carbon content.

Uses 
Common uses include:

 knife blades,
 surgical instruments,
 bearings,
 valves and pumps,
 measuring devices
 spring wire.

It is also used in the manufacture of heat treated steel pipes used for CO2 carbon capture and storage.

A commercial variant of X46Cr13 with some Vanadium is known as 420HC and is used in the knife industry because of its ability to hold a superior edge.

Standards 
 EN numeric : 1.4034
 EN symbolic : X46Cr13
 Old AFNOR : Z40C13, Z44C14
 AISI : 420C
 ASTM : F899
 UNS : S 42000
 JIS : SUS420
 GOST : 40Ch13 ou 40X13
  : 4H13

Composition 
According to EN 10088.

 Carbon : 0.46 % (–0.03 / +0.04)
 Chromium : 13% (–0.5 / +0.5)
 Silicium < 1%
 Manganese < 1%
 Phosphorus < 0.04 %
 Sulfur < 0.03 %

See also 
 Steel grades
 List of blade materials

References 

Stainless steel